This is a list of schools in Oxfordshire, England.

State-funded schools

Primary schools

Abbey Woods Academy, Berinsfield
All Saints CE Primary School, Didcot
Appleton CE Primary School, Appleton
Ashbury with Compton Beauchamp CE Primary School, Ashbury
Aston and Cote CE Primary School, Aston
Aston Rowant CE Primary School, Aston Rowant
Aureus Primary School, Didcot
Badgemore Primary School, Henley-on-Thames
Bampton CE Primary School, Bampton
Barley Hill Primary School, Thame
Barton Park Primary School, Oxford
The Batt CE Primary School, Witney
Bayard's Hill School, Headington
Beckley CE Primary School, Beckley
Benson CE Primary School, Benson
Bishop Carpenter CE Primary School, North Newington
Bishop Loveday CE Primary School, Bodicote
Bladon CE Primary School, Bladon
The Blake CE Primary School, Cogges
Bletchingdon Parochial CE Primary School, Bletchingdon
Blewbury CE Primary School, Blewbury
Bloxham CE Primary School, Bloxham
Botley School, Botley
Brightwell-cum-Sotwell CE Primary School, Brightwell-cum-Sotwell
Brize Norton Primary School, Brize Norton
Brookside Primary School, Bicester
Bruern Abbey School, Chesterton
Buckland CE Primary School, Buckland
Bure Park Primary School, Bicester
Burford Primary School, Burford
Caldecott Primary School, Abingdon-on-Thames
Carswell Community Primary School, Abingdon-on-Thames
Carterton Primary School, Carterton
Chadlington CE Primary School, Chadlington
Chalgrove Community Primary School, Chalgrove
Charlbury Primary School, Charlbury
Charlton Primary School, Wantage
Charlton-on-Otmoor CE Primary School, Charlton-on-Otmoor
Checkendon CE Primary School, Checkendon
Cherry Fields Primary School, Banbury
Chesterton CE Primary School, Chesterton
Chilton County Primary School, Chilton
Cholsey Primary School, Cholsey
Christopher Rawlins CE Primary School, Adderbury
Church Cowley St James CE Primary School, Cowley
Clanfield CE Primary School, Clanfield
Clifton Hampden CE Primary School, Clifton Hampden
Combe CE Primary School, Combe
Cropredy CE Primary School, Cropredy
Crowmarsh Gifford CE School, Crowmarsh Gifford
Cumnor CE School, Cumnor
Cutteslowe Primary School, Cutteslowe
Dashwood Banbury Academy, Banbury
Deddington CE Primary School, Deddington
Didcot Primary Academy, Didcot
Dorchester St Birinus CE School, Dorchester on Thames
Dr Radcliffe's CE Primary School, Steeple Aston
Dr South's CE Primary School, Islip
Drayton Community Primary School, Drayton
Dry Sandford Primary School, Dry Sandford
Ducklington Primary School, Ducklington
Dunmore Primary School, Abingdon-on-Thames
East Oxford Primary School, Cowley
Edith Moorhouse Primary School, Carterton
Edward Feild Primary School, Kidlington
Enstone Primary School, Enstone
Europa School UK, Culham
Ewelme CE Primary School, Ewelme
Eynsham Community Primary School, Eynsham
Faringdon Infant School, Faringdon
Faringdon Junior School, Faringdon
Finmere CE Primary School, Finmere
Finstock CE Primary School, Finstock
Fir Tree Junior School, Wallingford
Five Acres Primary School, Ambrosden
Freeland CE Primary School, Freeland
Fringford CE Primary School, Fringford
Fritwell CE Primary School, Fritwell
Gagle Brook Primary School, Bicester
Garsington CE Primary School, Garsington
Gateway Primary School, Carterton
Glory Farm Primary School, Bicester
Goring CE Primary School, Goring-on-Thames
The Grange Community Primary School, Banbury
Great Milton CE Primary School, Great Milton
Great Rollright CE Primary School, Great Rollright
Great Tew County Primary School, Great Tew
Grove CE School, Grove
Hagbourne CE Primary School, East Hagbourne
Hailey CE Primary School, Hailey
Hanborough Manor CE School, Long Hanborough
Hanwell Fields Community School, Banbury
Hardwick Primary School, Banbury
Harriers Banbury Academy, Banbury
Harwell Primary School, Harwell
The Hendreds CE School, East Hendred
Heyford Park School, Upper Heyford
Hill View Primary School, Banbury
Holy Trinity RC School, Chipping Norton
Hook Norton CE Primary School, Hook Norton
Hornton Primary School, Hornton
Horspath CE Primary School, Horspath
John Blandy Primary School, Southmoor
John Hampden Primary School, Thame
John Henry Newman Academy, Littlemore
Kidmore End CE Primary School, Kidmore End
Kingham Primary School, Kingham
King's Meadow Primary School, Bicester
Kirtlington CE Primary School, Kirtlington
Ladygrove Park Primary School, Didcot
Langford Village Community Primary School, Bicester
Larkrise Primary School, Oxford
Launton CE Primary School, Launton
Leafield CE Primary School, Leafield
Lewknor CE Primary School, Lewknor
Little Milton CE Primary School, Little Milton
Long Furlong Primary School, Abingdon-on-Thames
Long Wittenham CE Primary School, Long Wittenham
Longcot and Fernham CE Primary School, Longcot
Longfields Primary and Nursery School, Bicester
Longford Park Primary School, Bodicote
Madley Brook Community Primary School, Witney
Manor Primary School, Didcot
Marcham CE Primary School, Marcham
Marsh Baldon CE Primary School, Marsh Baldon
Middle Barton Primary School, Middle Barton
Mill Lane Community Primary School, Chinnor
Millbrook Primary School, Grove
Nettlebed Community School, Nettlebed
New Hinksey CE Primary School, Oxford
New Marston Primary School, Headington
North Hinksey CE Primary School, North Hinksey
North Kidlington Primary School, Kidlington
North Leigh CE School, North Leigh
Northbourne CE Primary School, Didcot
Orchard Fields Community School, Banbury
Orchard Meadow Primary School, Oxford
Our Lady of Lourdes RC Primary School, Witney
Our Lady's RC Primary School, Cowley
Pegasus School, Blackbird Leys
Peppard CE Primary School, Rotherfield Peppard
Queen Emma's Primary School, Witney
Queensway School, Banbury
Radley CE Primary School, Radley
RAF Benson Community Primary School, Benson
The Ridgeway CE Primary School, Childrey
Rose Hill Primary School, Rose Hill
Rush Common School, Abingdon-on-Thames
Sacred Heart RC Primary School, Henley-on-Thames
St Aloysius' RC Primary School, Oxford
St Amand's RC Primary School, East Hendred
St Andrew's CE Primary School, Chinnor
St Andrew's CE Primary School, Headington
St Barnabas' CE Primary School, Oxford
St Blaise CE Primary School, Abingdon-on-Thames
St Christopher's CE School, Cowley
St Christopher's CE School, Langford
St Ebbe's CE Primary School, Oxford
St Edburg's CE School, Bicester
St Edmund's RC Primary School, Abingdon-on-Thames
St Francis Church of England Primary School, Cowley
St Frideswide CE Primary School, Oxford
St James CE Primary School, East Hanney
St John Fisher RC Primary School, Littlemore
St John the Evangelist CE Primary School, Carterton
St John's Primary School, Wallingford
St John's RC Primary School, Banbury
St Joseph's RC Primary School, Banbury
St Joseph's RC Primary School, Carterton
St Joseph's RC Primary School, Headington
St Joseph's RC Primary School, Thame
St Kenelm's CE School, Minster Lovell
St Laurence CE School, Warborough
St Leonard's CE Primary School, Banbury
St Mary and John CE Primary School, Oxford
St Mary's CE Infant School, Witney
St Mary's CE Primary School, Banbury
St Mary's CE Primary School, Chipping Norton
St Mary's RC Primary School, Bicester
St Michael's CE Primary School, Marston
St Michael's CE Primary School, Steventon
St Nicholas CE Primary School, Abingdon-on-Thames
St Nicholas CE Primary School, East Challow
St Nicholas' CE Infants' School, Wallingford
St Nicholas' Primary School, Oxford
St Peter's CE Primary School, Cassington
St Peter's CE School, Alvescot
St Philip and James' CE Primary School, Oxford
St Swithun's CE Primary School, Kennington
St Thomas More RC Primary School, Kidlington
Sandhills Community Primary School, Sandhills
Shellingford CE School, Shellingford
Shenington CE Primary School, Shenington
Shiplake CE School, Shiplake
Shrivenham CE School, Shrivenham
Sibford Gower Endowed Primary School, Sibford Gower
Sonning Common Primary School, Sonning Common
South Moreton Primary School, South Moreton
South Stoke Primary School, South Stoke
Southwold Primary School, Bicester
Stadhampton Primary School, Stadhampton
Standlake CE Primary School, Standlake
Stanford in the Vale CE Primary School, Stanford in the Vale
Stanton Harcourt CE Primary School, Stanton Harcourt
Stephen Freeman Community Primary School, Didcot
Stockham Primary School, Wantage
Stoke Row CE Primary School, Stoke Row
Stonesfield Primary School, Stonesfield
Sunningwell CE Primary School, Sunningwell
Sutton Courtenay CE Primary School, Sutton Courtenay
Tackley CE Primary School, Tackley
Tetsworth Primary School, Tetsworth
Thameside Primary School, Abingdon-on-Thames
Thomas Reade Primary School, Abingdon-on-Thames
Tower Hill Community Primary School, Witney
Trinity CE Primary School, Henley-on-Thames
Tyndale Community School, Cowley
Uffington CE Primary School, Uffington
Valley Road School, Henley-on-Thames
Wantage CE Primary School, Wantage
Wantage Primary Academy, Wantage
Watchfield Primary School, Watchfield
Watlington Primary School, Watlington
West Kidlington Primary School, Kidlington
West Oxford Community Primary School, Oxford
West Witney Primary School, Witney
Wheatley Church of England Primary School, Wheatley
Whitchurch Primary School, Whitchurch-on-Thames
William Fletcher Primary School, Yarnton
William Morris Primary School, Banbury
Willowcroft Community School, Didcot
Windale Primary School, Oxford
Windmill Primary School, Headington
Windrush CE Primary School, Witney
Witney Community Primary School, Witney
Wolvercote Primary School, Wolvercote
Wood Farm Primary School, Headington
Woodcote Primary School, Woodcote
Woodstock CE Primary School, Woodstock
Wootton St Peter's CE Primary School, Wootton
Wootton-By-Woodstock CE Primary School, Wootton
Wroxton CE Primary School, Wroxton
Wychwood CE Primary School, Shipton-under-Wychwood

Secondary schools

Bartholomew School, Eynsham
The Bicester School, Bicester
Blessed George Napier Roman Catholic School, Banbury
Burford School, Burford
Carterton Community College, Carterton
Cheney School, Headington
Cherwell School, Oxford
Chipping Norton School, Chipping Norton
The Cooper School, Bicester
Didcot Girls' School, Didcot
Europa School UK, Culham
Faringdon Community College, Faringdon
Fitzharrys School, Abingdon-on-Thames
Futures Institute, Banbury
Gillotts School, Henley-on-Thames
Gosford Hill School, Kidlington
Greyfriars Catholic School, Oxford
Henry Box School, Witney
Heyford Park School, Upper Heyford
Icknield Community College, Watlington
John Mason School, Abingdon-on-Thames
King Alfred's Academy, Wantage
Langtree School, Woodcote
Larkmead School, Abingdon-on-Thames
Lord Williams's School, Thame
Maiden Erlegh Chiltern Edge, Sonning Common
Marlborough School, Woodstock
Matthew Arnold School, Oxford
North Oxfordshire Academy, Banbury
Oxford Academy, Littlemore 
Oxford Spires Academy, Oxford
St Birinus School, Didcot
The Swan School, Oxford
UTC Oxfordshire, Didcot
Wallingford School, Wallingford
The Warriner School, Bloxham
Wheatley Park School, Holton
Whitelands Academy, Bicester
Wood Green School, Witney
Wykham Park Academy, Banbury

Special and alternative schools

Bardwell School, Bicester
Bishopswood School, Sonning Common
Endeavour Academy, Headington
Fitzwaryn School, Wantage
Frank Wise School, Banbury
The Iffley Academy, Oxford
John Watson School, Wheatley
Kingfisher School, Abingdon-on-Thames
Mabel Prichard School, Oxford
Meadowbrook College, Old Marston
Northern House Academy, Oxford
Orion Academy, Blackbird Leys
Oxfordshire Hospital School, Old Marston
Springfield School, Madley Park
Woodeaton Manor School, Woodeaton

Further education
Abingdon and Witney College
Banbury and Bicester College
City of Oxford College
Henley College

Independent schools

Primary and preparatory schools

Abingdon Preparatory School, Frilford
Bruern Abbey School, Chesterton
Chandlings, Bagley Wood
Christ Church Cathedral School, Oxford
Cothill House, Kennington
Dragon School, Oxford
Emmanuel Christian School, Littlemore
Kitebrook Preparatory School, Chastleton
The Manor Preparatory School, Shippon
Moulsford Preparatory School, Moulsford
New College School, Oxford
The Oratory Preparatory School, Goring Heath
Pinewood School, Bourton
Rupert House School, Henley-on-Thames
St Hugh's School, Faringdon
St John's Priory School, Banbury
St Mary's Preparatory School, Henley-on-Thames
Summer Fields School, Oxford
The Treehouse School, Cholsey
Windrush Valley School, Ascott-under-Wychwood

Senior and all-through schools

Abingdon School, Abingdon-on-Thames
Bloxham School, Bloxham
Carfax College, Oxford
Cherwell College, Oxford
Cokethorpe School, Witney
Cranford House School, Wallingford
D'Overbroeck's College, Oxford
Headington School, Oxford
Kingham Hill School, Chipping Norton
Kings Oxford, Oxford
King's School, Witney
Magdalen College School, Oxford
The Oratory School, Woodcote
Our Lady's Abingdon, Abingdon
Oxford High School, Oxford
Oxford International College, Oxford
Oxford Montessori Schools, Elsfield
Oxford Sixth Form College, Oxford
Radley College, Radley
Rye St Antony School, Oxford
St Clare's, Oxford
St Edward's School, Oxford
St Helen and St Katharine, Abingdon-on-Thames
Shiplake College, Shiplake
Sibford School, Sibford Ferris
Tudor Hall School, Banbury
Wychwood School, Oxford

Special and alternative schools

Chilworth House School, Wheatley
Chilworth House Upper School, Oxford
Huckleberry Therapeutic School, Wantage
Include Oxfordshire, Oxford
LVS Oxford, Begbroke
Mulberry Bush School, Standlake
Park School, Chipping Norton
Sandwell Learning Centre, Alvescot
Swalcliffe Park School, Swalcliffe
The Unicorn School, Abingdon-on-Thames

Further education
EF Academy, Oxford
Greene's Tutorial College, Oxford

References

External links
Schools, Oxfordshire County Council

Oxfordshire
Schools in Oxfordshire
Lists of buildings and structures in Oxfordshire